The End of Sex is a 2022 Canadian romantic comedy film, directed by Sean Garrity. The film stars Jonas Chernick and Emily Hampshire as Josh and Emma, a young married couple who are feeling pressured by the demands of parenthood, and ship their kids off to camp so that they can embark on a series of sexual adventures to reignite the passion in their relationship.

The cast also includes Gray Powell, Lily Gao, Melanie Scrofano, and Pedro Miguel Arce.

The film was shot in Hamilton, Ontario, in early 2022. 

The film premiered at the 2022 Toronto International Film Festival on September 10, 2022. It also screened in the Borsos Competition at the 2022 Whistler Film Festival.

Ari Posner received a Canadian Screen Award nomination for Best Original Score at the 11th Canadian Screen Awards in 2023.

Cast 

 Emily Hampshire as Emma
 Lily Gao as Kelly
 Gray Powell as Marlon
 Pedro Miguel Arce as Jory
 Melanie Scrofano as Wendy
 Steven McCarthy as Gary

References

External links

2022 films
2022 romantic comedy films
Canadian sex comedy films
Canadian romantic comedy films
English-language Canadian films
Films directed by Sean Garrity
Films shot in Hamilton, Ontario
2020s English-language films
2020s Canadian films